Ghent is a city in Belgium.

Ghent may also refer to:

Places
United States
Ghent, Kentucky
Ghent, Minnesota
Ghent (CDP), New York
Ghent, New York
Ghent (NYCRR station), a former railway station in the New York town of the same name
Ghent, Ohio
Ghent (Norfolk), Virginia
Ghent, West Virginia

Other uses
 Ghent (surname)
 K.A.A. Gent, a Belgian football club
 Treaty of Ghent

See also 
Gent (disambiguation)
Gente (disambiguation)